Franklyn Saliya Ahangama (born 14 September 1959) is a Sri Lankan Australian cricket coach, commentator and former cricketer who played in 3 Tests and one ODI in 1985.

After cricket
He would have played more tests, having a bowling average of 19, but retired due to constant injury. He then became a commentator. Saliya is now a cricket coach at the Melbourne Sports Stadium and Eastern Indoor Sports Centre. He is married and has two daughters.

References

External links 

1959 births
Living people
Sri Lanka One Day International cricketers
Sri Lanka Test cricketers
Sri Lankan cricketers
Sri Lankan emigrants to Australia
Alumni of S. Thomas' College, Mount Lavinia
Sri Lankan cricket commentators
Sinhalese Sports Club cricketers
Australian cricket coaches